Margaret Shea may refer to:

 Margaret Shea (sailor) (born 1989), American sailor
 Margaret Shea (scientist), space scientist